The Sri Lanka men's cricket team is touring New Zealand in March and April 2023 to play two Test,  three One Day International (ODI) and three Twenty20 International (T20I) matches. The Test matches formed part of the 2021–2023 ICC World Test Championship and the ODI series will form part of the inaugural 2020–2023 ICC Cricket World Cup Super League.

Squads

On 12 March 2023, Doug Bracewell was added to the New Zealand's squad for the second Test. On the same day, New Zealand's Neil Wagner was ruled out of second Test due to an injury. 

Finn Allen, Lockie Ferguson and Glenn Phillips were selected in the New Zealand's ODI squad only for the first ODI, while Mark Chapman, Benjamin Lister and Henry Nicholls only for the last two ODIs. on 18 March 2023, Rachin Ravindra replaced Michael Bracewell, who was released from the New Zealand's ODI squad to join Royal Challengers Bangalore for the 2023 Indian Premier League.

Tour match

Test series

1st Test

The final day of the match started with New Zealand on 28/1, needing a total of 285 runs to win. The play of the day was reduced to 53 overs because of rain. In a dramatic finish, New Zealand tied the score with two balls remaining, and scored the winning run by running a bye on the final ball.

2nd Test

ODI series

1st ODI

2nd ODI

3rd ODI

T20I series

1st T20I

2nd T20I

3rd T20I

Notes

References

External links
 Series home at ESPNcricinfo

2023 in New Zealand cricket
2023 in Sri Lankan cricket
Sri Lankan cricket tours of New Zealand
International cricket competitions in 2022–23
Current cricket tours